The following radio stations broadcast on FM frequency 94.9 MHz:

Argentina
 949MHZ in Mar del Plata, Buenos Aires
 Brava in Puerto Madryn, Chubut
 Britos in Quimili, Santiago del Estero
 Full in Eduardo Castex, La Pampa
 HIT95 in Rosario, Santa Fe
 Ideal en Santa Fe de la Vera Cruz, Santa Fe
 La Plaza in Salta
 La Sabrosita in Buenos Aires
 Mercedes in Villa Mercedes, San Luis
 Monumental in Ushuaia, Tierra del Fuego
 Patagonia in General Roca, Río Negro
 Play in Alcorta, Santa Fe
 Primavera in Pujato, Santa Fe
 Radio María in Carmen de Patagones, Buenos Aires
 Radio María in Andalgalá, Catamarca
 Radio María in Formosa
 Radio María in San Cristóbal, Santa Fe
 Radio María in Villa Gobernador Gálvez, Santa Fe
 Rock and Pop Corrientes in Corrientes
 Somos Radio in San Francisco, Córdoba
 Zensitive in Tigre, Buenos Aires

Australia
Cross FM in Broken Hill, New South Wales
Rhema FM in Gosford, New South Wales
Triple J in Alice Springs, Northern Territory
4MIX in Brisbane, Queensland
3JOY in Melbourne, Victoria
Triple J in Hamilton, Victoria
ABC Classic in Geraldton, Western Australia

Bermuda
ZFB-FM at Hamilton

Canada (Channel 235)
 CBKV-FM in Cumberland House, Saskatchewan
 CBON-FM-7 in Espanola, Ontario
 CBTA-FM in Trail, British Columbia
 CBUF-FM-8 in Port Alberni, British Columbia
 CFFM-FM-2 in Quesnel, British Columbia
 CFGD-FM in Brisay, Quebec
 CFUG-FM in Tatalrose, British Columbia
 CHGL-FM in Green Lake, Saskatchewan
 CHME-FM in Les Escoumins, Quebec
 CHRW-FM in London, Ontario
 CIEU-FM in Carleton, Quebec
 CIMF-FM in Gatineau, Quebec
 CJPR-FM in Blairmore, Alberta
 CKGE-FM in Oshawa, Ontario
 CKPE-FM in Sydney, Nova Scotia
 CKUA-FM in Edmonton, Alberta
 CKWM-FM in Kentville, Nova Scotia
 CKYL-FM in Peace River, Alberta
 VF2345 in Logan Lake, British Columbia
 VF2481 in Coal Valley Mine, Alberta

China 
 CNR Business Radio in Fuzhou
 CNR Cross-Strait Radio in Xiamen, Zhangzhou and south of Quanzhou

Ireland
 4fm in Dublin

Japan
 KBS Kyoto Radio in Kyoto

Malaysia
 Radio Klasik in Kedah, Perlis and Penang

Mexico
XHCCAV-FM in Durango, Durango
XHCHH-FM in Chihuahua, Chihuahua
XHEOA-FM in Oaxaca, Oaxaca
XHEPAS-FM in Mulegé, Baja California Sur
XHEXL-FM in Pátzcuaro, Michoacán
XHFM-FM in Veracruz, Veracruz
XHMAE-FM in Ciudad Mante, Tamaulipas
XHORO-FM in Puebla, Puebla
XHPBCQ-FM in Cancún, Quintana Roo
XHPCEL-FM in Celestún, Yucatán
XHPTEA-FM in Soteapan, Veracruz
XHQZ-FM in San Juan de los Lagos, Jalisco
XHSB-FM in Santa Bárbara, Chihuahua
XHSW-FM in Cuernavaca, Morelos
XHTEC-FM in Monterrey, Nuevo León
XHTVH-FM in Villahermosa, Tabasco
XHTW-FM in Tampico, Tamaulipas
XHUDC-FM in Colima, Colima
XHZG-FM in Ixmiquilpan, Hidalgo

Taiwan 
 Transfer CNR Cross-Strait Radio in Kinmen

United Kingdom
 BBC London in London
 BBC Radio Lincolnshire in Lincolnshire

United States (Channel 235)
 KAGO-FM in Altamont, Oregon
 KBGE in Cannon Beach, Oregon
 KBIM-FM in Roswell, New Mexico
  in Tulare, California
  in San Diego, California
  in Cedar City, Utah
  in Kansas City, Missouri
  in Albert Lea, Minnesota
 KCUS-LP in Pittsburg, Texas
 KDJA in Terrebonne, Oregon
 KECS-LP in Lafayette, Louisiana
 KENZ in Provo, Utah
 KEON in Ganado, Texas
 KESU-LP in Lihue, Hawaii
  in Des Moines, Iowa
 KHKN in Maumelle, Arkansas
 KHMZ in Snyder, Texas
  in Baker, California
 KIND-FM in Elk City, Kansas
  in Richland, Washington
 KIWW-LP in Liberal, Kansas
  in North Platte, Nebraska
 KLCH in Lake City, Minnesota
  in Aberdeen, South Dakota
 KLTY in Arlington, Texas
  in Cold Spring, Minnesota
  in Tucson, Arizona
 KNCK-FM in Concordia, Kansas
 KOCZ-LP in Opelousas, Louisiana
  in Electra, Texas
 KPFG-LP in Pasadena, Texas
  in Pocatello, Idaho
 KPLL-LP in Lewiston, Idaho
  in Cayucos, California
  in Duluth, Minnesota
 KQUR in Laredo, Texas
 KRAD-LP in Millersburg, Oregon
 KRBS-LP in Brownsville, Texas
 KRMW in Cedarville, Arkansas
 KRUT-LP in Houston, Texas
  in Nampa, Idaho
  in Coushatta, Louisiana
 KSDC-LP in Centralia, Missouri
 KTEE in North Bend, Oregon
  in Velva, North Dakota
  in Seattle, Washington
 KVWJ-LP in Hyrum, Utah
 KWWU-LP in Fulton, Missouri
  in Aztec, New Mexico
 KXTT in Maricopa, California
 KYLD in San Francisco, California
  in Missoula, Montana
 KZAX-LP in Bellingham, Washington
  in Sheridan, Wyoming
 WAAG in Galesburg, Illinois
 WAEM-LP in Acton, Massachusetts
 WAEZ in Greeneville, Tennessee
  in Dekalb, Illinois
 WGCQ in Ripley, Tennessee
 WGIC-LP in Clarksville, Tennessee
 WGNH in South Webster, Ohio
 WGUO in Reserve, Louisiana
  in Port Allegany, Pennsylvania
 WHNL-LP in Hinesville, Georgia
 WHOM in Mount Washington, New Hampshire
 WJJF in Montauk, New York
 WKHI in Newark, Maryland
  in Hillman, Michigan
  in Frankfort, New York
  in Columbus, Mississippi
  in Mobile, Alabama
  in Bartlett, Tennessee
  in Scottville, Michigan
  in East Lansing, Michigan
  in Collinwood, Tennessee
  in Oliver, Pennsylvania
 WOHA in Ada, Ohio
 WOKE-LP in Fort Myers, Florida
  in Baraboo, Wisconsin
 WPJI-LP in Hopkinsville, Kentucky
 WPMX in Millen, Georgia
  in Virginia Beach, Virginia
 WQMX in Medina, Ohio
  in Harrisburg, Pennsylvania
 WREW in Fairfield, Ohio
  in Danville, Illinois
 WRLE-LP in Dunnellon, Florida
  in Folsom, Pennsylvania
  in Benton Harbor, Michigan
  in Roanoke, Virginia
  in Millinocket, Maine
 WTNE-LP in Cleveland, Tennessee
  in Tallahassee, Florida
 WUBL in Atlanta, Georgia
 WUDS-LP in Woodstock, Virginia
 WUPZ in Chocolay Township, Michigan
  in Loris, South Carolina
  in Tampa, Florida
 WXJP-LP in Ridgeland, South Carolina
 WXRJ-LP in Bloomington, Illinois
 WYNG in Mount Carmel, Illinois
 WZMR-LP in East Boston, Massachusetts
 WZMW-LP in East Boston, Massachusetts
  in Miami Beach, Florida

References

Lists of radio stations by frequency